Acephalous (Greek: "without a head") may refer to:

Acephalous society
Acephalous line
Acephali